Morten Gunnar Larsen (born 1 October 1955) is a Norwegian jazz pianist and composer, well known for several stride piano recordings and collaborations.

Career 
Larsen studied classical piano at Norges Musikkhøgskole (1978).  In 1975 he had his debut records, Classic Rags and Stomps, for which he won Spellemannprisen in 1976. He next founded Ophelia Ragtime Orchestra in 1977 and performed with stride pianist Eubie Blake, for whom Larsen composed Memories of Eubie. Larsen worked in New Orleans over longer periods of time, resulting in a tour and the performance One mo' time (1979–81) written by Vernel Bagneris.

Larsen's collaboration with Bagneris continued with the performance Jelly Roll!! – The Music and the Man, dedicated Jelly Roll Morton, and performed at Oslo Jazzfestival 1990.  It also had eleven months at Off-Broadway (1994–95) and was released as a CD (GHB, 1996).  This work gave Larsen the OBIE Award 1995.  He had earlier received the Buddy Award of Foreningen norske jazzmusikeres "Årets jazzmusiker" (1992) in his home country. 
He participated in several recordings in the Magnolia Jazzband (1974–93) and Ytre Suløens Jassensemble up until 1992 and has participated in Norbert Susemihl's Joyful Gumbo (2011–present).

Discography
 Don't You Leave Me Here (1978)
 Plays Robert Clemente (1981)
 Echo of Spring (Hot Club, 1983)
 Maple Leaf Rag (Herman, 1989)
 Charleston Rag (Herman, 1995)
 Ragtime and Rhapsody (Herman, 2005) 1997 concert in Levanger
 Fingerbreaker (Decca, 1999)
 Rhapsody (2000) with G. M. Reiss

References

External links 
Morten Gunnar Larsen Extended Biography on Norsk Biografisk Leksikon

20th-century Norwegian pianists
21st-century Norwegian pianists
Norwegian jazz pianists
Norwegian classical pianists
Ragtime pianists
1955 births
Living people
Musicians from Oslo
Hot Club Records artists
21st-century classical pianists
Union Rhythm Kings members
Decca Records artists
Curling Legs artists